Raven Klaasen and Izak van der Merwe were the defending champions but decided not to participate together.
Klaasen plays alongside John Paul Fruttero, while van der Merwe partners up with Rik de Voest.
They went on to win the title 2–6, 6–3, [10–4] against Martin Emmrich and Andreas Siljeström in the final.

Seeds

Draw

Draw

References
 Main Draw

JSM Challenger of Champaign-Urbana - Doubles
JSM Challenger of Champaign–Urbana